Rudolph Flowers (born 1980) is a Belizean soccer player who plays in the position of forward.

Club career
In the 2002-3 season he played for Juventus FC of Orange Walk, Belize, and scored eight goals, making him the leading scorer of that season.

External links
 PlayerHistory.com 
 Belize - List of Topscorers

1980 births
Living people
Belizean footballers

Association football forwards